The Dutch Twenty20 Cup is a Twenty20 cricket league in the Netherlands, run by the Koninklijke Nederlandse Cricket Bond (Royal Dutch Cricket Board) since 2007. Currently, the league consists of 16 teams, divided into two divisions of five teams and one division of six teams.

Teams

Previous cup winners

2007 - Quick Haag
2008 - HCC
2009 - Excelsior'20
2010 - VRA
2011 - VRA
2012 - VRA
2013 - Dosti
2014 - Dosti
2015 - VRA 
2016 - ACC
2017 - ACC
2018 - HBS
2019 - VOC
2020 - VRA
2021 - VOC
2022 - VOC

Finals
24/07/2018 - HBS 139/7 (20 overs) (Barresi 26) beat ACC 108 a.o. (17.3 overs) (Saqib 26, Navjit Singh 4-7) by 21 runs.

References

External links
  Official Website

Cricket in the Netherlands
Dutch domestic cricket competitions